Maplewood, also known as the David C. Voorhees House or the John A. Voorhees House, was a historic building overlooking Burnt Hill Road at Rock Brook in Montgomery Township, Somerset County, New Jersey. It was added to the National Register of Historic Places on August 24, 2000. for its significance in architecture and health/medicine. It was destroyed by fire on November 19, 2011.

History
The house was built in 1845 by John A. Voorhees as a farmhouse. When he died in 1876, it passed to his son David C. Voorhees. At this time the house was known as Maplewood.  When he died in 1898, the farm was sold to the State of New Jersey to be used as the New Jersey State Village for Epileptics. Maplewood then became the Superintendent's Residence of the Village.

Gallery

References

National Register of Historic Places in Somerset County, New Jersey
Houses on the National Register of Historic Places in New Jersey
Houses in Somerset County, New Jersey
New Jersey Register of Historic Places
Greek Revival houses in New Jersey
Houses completed in 1845
Montgomery Township, New Jersey